Kibondo Urban is an administrative ward in Muhambwe Constituency in Kibondo District of Kigoma Region in Tanzania. 
In 2016 the Tanzania National Bureau of Statistics report there were 32,611 people in the ward, from 39,300 in 2012.

Villages / neighborhoods 
The ward has 4 villages and 33 hamlets. Biturana village split off into its own ward in 2014.

 Kibondo
 Boma
 Kanyamahela
 Katelela
 Katunguru
 Kumwayi
 Kumwerulo
 Kumwerulo
 Kumwerulo Kati
 Nankuye
 Sokoni
 Uswahilini
 Uwanjani
 Nengo
 Kanyinya A
 Kasanda
 Kumbizi
 Kumbizi Mtoni
 Majengo Mapya
 Mlesha
 Nengo Kati
 Nengo Shuleni
 Nyamisivyi
 Ruchamisanga
 Kumwambu
 Kabwigwa
 Kibingo
 Kingoro
 Kumgarika
 Kumkenga
 Kumwambu
 Nakayuki
 Nabuhima
 Kumwai
 Msikitini
 Nabuhima
 Nyamwela

References

Kibondo District
Wards of Kigoma Region
Constituencies of Tanzania